Mariana Esta De Fiesta... Atrévete!!! is the fourth album by the Mexican singer Mariana Seoane, released in 2007.

Track listing
 Atrévete A Mirarme De Frente
 Los Domingos
 Llorando Se Fue
 A Mover La Colita
 Mil Horas
 Cosita Linda
 El Canalla
 Caballo Viejo
 Que No Quede Huella (feat. José Guadalupe Esparza)
 La Hierba Se Movía
 Fiesta
 Cosas del Amor (feat. Margarita "La Diosa de la Cumbia")
 Atrévete A Mirarme De Frente (Grupera)
 Atrévete A Mirarme De Frente (Pop)

References

Mariana Seoane albums
2007 albums